Aloe elegans is a species of plant. It is found in West Sudan, Eritrea to Central Ethiopia.

See also 
 List of Aloe species
 List of plants in the Gibraltar Botanic Gardens
 List of least concern plants

References

External links 

 Aloe elegans at The Plant List

elegans
Plants described in 1882